Mandil Besar (also Romanized as Mandīl Besar) is a village in Sara Rural District, in the Central District of Saqqez County, Kurdistan Province, Iran. As at the 2006 census, its population was 23, in 5 families. The village is populated by Kurds.

References 

Towns and villages in Saqqez County
Kurdish settlements in Kurdistan Province